Bowling at the 2018 Asian Games was held at Jakabaring Bowling Center, Palembang, Indonesia from 22 August to 27 August 2018.

Schedule

Medalists

Men

Women

Medal table

Participating nations
A total of 166 athletes from 18 nations competed in bowling at the 2018 Asian Games:

References

External links
Bowling at the 2018 Asian Games
Official Result Book – Bowling

 
2018 Asian Games events
2018
Asian Games